In mathematics, the Euler function is given by

Named after Leonhard Euler, it is a model example of a q-series and provides the prototypical example of a relation between combinatorics and complex analysis.

Properties
The coefficient  in the formal power series expansion for  gives the number of partitions of k.  That is,

where  is the partition function.

The Euler identity, also known as the Pentagonal number theorem, is

 is a pentagonal number.

The Euler function is related to the Dedekind eta function as

The Euler function may be expressed as a q-Pochhammer symbol:

The logarithm of the Euler function is the sum of the logarithms in the product expression, each of which may be expanded about q = 0, yielding

which is a Lambert series with coefficients -1/n. The logarithm of the Euler function may therefore be expressed as

where  -[1/1, 3/2, 4/3, 7/4, 6/5, 12/6, 8/7, 15/8, 13/9, 18/10, ...] (see OEIS A000203)

On account of the identity  this may also be written as

Special values

The next identities come from Ramanujan's Notebooks:

 

 

 

 

Using the Pentagonal number theorem, exchanging sum and integral, and then invoking complex-analytic methods, one derives

References

Notes

Other

 

Number theory
Q-analogs
Leonhard Euler

km:អនុគមន៍អឺលែរ